Sugarloaf Mountain is a mountain south-west of Glengarriff in County Cork, Ireland.

Geography 
It is one of the Caha Mountains, its height is 574 metres and is the 319th highest summit in Ireland. It is popularly thought to be one of Ireland's few extinct volcanos but it actually owes its shape to erosion.

Etymology 
The Irish name Gabhal Mhór seems to have developed from Sliabh na Gaibhle meaning "mountain of the fork". The anglicised form Slieve Goul is found in several 19th century sources. Gabhal Mhór ("big fork") stands in contrast to its lower neighbouring peak Gabhal Bheag ("little fork"), anglicised as Gowlbeg.

References 

Mountains and hills of County Cork
Beara peninsula